Aşağı Emirhalil is a village in the Bayat District of Çorum Province in Turkey. Its population is 69 (2022). The village is populated by Kurds.

References

Villages in Bayat District, Çorum
Kurdish settlements in Çorum Province